Indian Lake may refer to:

Lakes
Indian Lake (Connecticut – New York), adjacent to New York State Route 361
Indian Lake (Indiana)
Indian Lake (Massachusetts)
Indian Lake (Michigan), a set index article, including:
Indian Lake (Cass County, Michigan)
Indian Lake (Schoolcraft County, Michigan)
Indian Lake (Blue Earth County, Minnesota)
Indian Lake (Nobles County, Minnesota)
Indian Lake, in Sibley County, Minnesota
Indian Lake (New Jersey)
Indian Lake (Hamilton County, New York), adjacent to the towns of Indian Lake and Lake Pleasant
Indian Lake, in Morehouse, Hamilton County, New York
Indian Lake (Ohio)
Indian Lake (Washington County, Rhode Island)
Indian Lake (Wisconsin)
Indian Lake (Teton County, Wyoming)

Settlements
Indian Lake Township, Nobles County, Minnesota
Indian Lake, Missouri
Indian Lake, New York
Indian Lake (hamlet), New York
Indian Lake, Pennsylvania
Indian Lake, in South Kingstown, Rhode Island
Indian Lake, Texas

Songs
"Indian Lake" (song), a 1968 song by the Cowsills

See also
Big Injun Lake